Always & Forever: The Classics is a greatest hits album by American R&B/soul singer Luther Vandross, released in 1998 (see 1998 in music). It contains Luther's best known cover songs.

Track listing
"A House Is Not a Home" – 7:08
"Since I Lost My Baby" – 5:25
"Superstar/Until You Come Back to Me (That's What I'm Gonna Do)" – 9:18
"Creepin'" – 4:04
"Anyone Who Had a Heart" – 5:46
"I (Who Have Nothing)" (with Martha Wash) – 7:28
"If This World Were Mine" (with Cheryl Lynn) – 5:24
"Goin' Out of My Head" – 5:17
"Going in Circles" – 5:12
"Knocks Me off My Feet" – 3:45
"Love Won't Let Me Wait" – 7:20
"Always and Forever" – 4:56

Charts

References

1998 greatest hits albums
Albums produced by Luther Vandross
Albums produced by Walter Afanasieff
Luther Vandross compilation albums
Epic Records compilation albums